Dark Side of the 90s is a documentary television series created by Insight Productions and RailSplitter Pictures for Vice Studios that takes a look at popular culture of the 1990s. It is a spinoff of Vice's Dark Side of the Ring series. The first episode of Dark Side of the 90s aired on July 15, 2021. The series is narrated by Mark McGrath, vocalist of Sugar Ray, a rock band that attained mainstream popularity in the mid-to-late 1990s.

Series overview
<onlyinclude>

Episodes

Season 1 (2021)

Season 2 (2022)

See also
Bill Clinton
Columbine shootings
LA 92
O.J.: Made in America
Cable television
Leaving Neverland
Hip hop culture
Generation X
We Need to Talk About Cosby
Seinfeld & Friends - the decade's two popular sitcoms
Oklahoma City bombing
Gulf War
I, Tonya
MTV Generation

References

External links
Dark Side of the 90s on IMDb
Official website
Official trailer

2021 American television series debuts
2020s American documentary television series
Viceland original programming
American television spin-offs
Television series set in the 1990s